Seo Jun-young (born Kim Sang-gu, 김상구, April 24, 1987) is a South Korean actor. He is best known for his roles in award-winning indie Bleak Night, period drama Deep Rooted Tree, coming-of-age film Eighteen (also known as Whirlwind), and comedy series Super Daddy Yeol.

Filmography

Film

TV Movies

Television series

Web series

Music video

Awards and nominations

References

External links
 
 
 Seo Jun-young at Ice Enter Company
 Seo Jun-young Fan Cafe at Daum
 
 
 

South Korean male television actors
South Korean male film actors
1987 births
Living people
South Korean male models
21st-century South Korean male actors